Brad Upton (born 1952) is an American jazz trumpet player.

Early life and education 
Upton was born in Ann Arbor, Michigan, and raised in Oak Ridge, Tennessee. As a child, he studied piano and trumpet. He attended the Berklee College of Music from 1969 to 1971.

Career 
After leaving Berklee, Upton moved to New York City, where he worked as an arranger and composer for Lionel Hampton, Chet Baker, the Bob Mover Quintet, and Tito Puente. Upton moved to Boulder, Colorado, in 1983. In Boulder, Upton studied meditation practices under Chögyam Trungpa. He received two grants from the Boulder Arts Commission, which he used to continue composing jazz music.

Discography 

Black Orchid (1999)
Sweetness (1999)
Dragon (2002)
Lionheart (2003)

External links 

Short Biography Biography Black Orchid Music Website
To listen your music Songs Black Orchid Music Website
More about your discography [ All Music Guide]

References 

1952 births
Living people
American jazz trumpeters
American male trumpeters
Jazz musicians from Michigan
21st-century trumpeters
21st-century American male musicians
American male jazz musicians

People from Ann Arbor, Michigan
People from Oak Ridge, Tennessee
People from Boulder, Colorado